German submarine U-1007 was a Type VIIC/41 U-boat of Nazi Germany's Kriegsmarine during World War II.

She was ordered on 23 March 1942, and was laid down on 15 February 1943, at Blohm & Voss, Hamburg, as yard number 207. She was launched on 8 December 1943, and commissioned under the command of Kapitänleutnant Hans Hornkohl on 18 January 1944.

Design
German Type VIIC/41 submarines were preceded by the heavier Type VIIC submarines. U-1007 had a displacement of  when at the surface and  while submerged. She had two shafts and two  propellers.

U-1007 was fitted with five  torpedo tubes (four fitted at the bow and one at the stern), fourteen torpedoes or 26 TMA or TMB Naval mines, one  SK C/35 naval gun, (220 rounds), one  Flak M42 and two  C/30 anti-aircraft guns. The boat had a complement of between forty-four and fifty-two.

Service history
U-1007 participated in one war patrol which resulted in no ships damaged or sunk.

On 2 May 1945, U-1007 was in the Trave River north-east of Lübeck, when she was attacked by four Hawker Typhoon's of the 245th Sqn RAF piloted by F/Lt F.S. Murphy, F/O F.J. Pearson, W/O K.D. Woddan, and F/Sgt C.M. Brocklehurst. The rockets from the Typhoons badly damaged U-1007 forcing her crew to beach and scuttle her. Two of the crew died from the attack, one during and another of wounds in a hospital.

The wreck was raised in May 1946 and broken up.

See also
 Battle of the Atlantic

References

Bibliography

External links

German Type VIIC/41 submarines
U-boats commissioned in 1944
World War II submarines of Germany
1944 ships
Ships built in Hamburg
Operation Regenbogen (U-boat)
Maritime incidents in May 1945
U-boats scuttled in 1945